The gender binary (also known as gender binarism) is the classification of gender into two distinct, opposite forms of masculine and feminine, whether by social system, cultural belief, or both simultaneously. Most cultures use a gender binary, having two genders (boys/men and girls/women).

In this binary model, gender and sexuality may be assumed by default to align with one's genetic or gamete-based sex, i.e. one's sex assigned at birth. This may include certain expectations of how one dresses themselves, their behavior, sexual orientation, names or pronouns, which restroom they use, and other qualities. For example, when a male is born, gender binarism may assume that the male will be masculine in appearance, have masculine character traits and behaviors, as well as having a heterosexual attraction to females. These expectations may reinforce negative attitudes, biases, and discrimination towards people who display expressions of gender variance or nonconformity or those whose gender identity is incongruent with their birth sex.

General aspects

The term gender binary describes the system in which a society allocates its members into one of two sets of gender roles, gender identities, and attributes based on the type of genitalia they have. In the case of intersex people, those with rare genetic abnormalities which give them the sex organs of both sexes may have difficulties fitting into this system.

Scholars who study the gender binary from an intersectional feminist and critical race theory perspective argue that during the process of European colonization of the U.S., a binary system of gender was enforced as a means of protecting patriarchal norms and upholding European nationalism.

Traditional gender roles are influenced by the media, religion, mainstream education, political systems, cultural systems, and social systems. Major religions such as Islam and Christianity, in particular, act as authorities for gender roles. Islam, for example, teaches that mothers are the primary caregivers to their children. The Catholic Church, the largest Christian denomination, only ordains cisgender men as priests. Christianity supports its adherence to a gender binary with the Book of Genesis in the Bible, where it is declared in verse 27 that "God created man in His own image; in the image of God He created him; male and female He created them." Orthodox Judaism also forbids women to be ordained as rabbis and serve as clergy in their congregations.

In English, some nouns (e.g., boy), honorific titles (e.g., Miss), occupational titles (e.g., actress), and personal pronouns (e.g., she, his) are gendered, and they fall into a male/female binary. According to Hyde and colleagues, children raised within English-speaking (and other gendered-language) environments come to view gender as a binary category.  They state that for children who learn English as their primary language in the U.S., adults' use of the gender binary to explicitly sort individuals (i.e. "boys" and "girls" bathrooms and sports teams), and not just the presence of gender markers, causes gender biases.

Along with using the gender binary to categorize human bodies, cultures that obey the binary may also use it to label things, places, and ideas. For example, in American culture, people identify playing sports as a masculine activity and shopping as a feminine activity; blue is a color for boys while pink is for girls; care work is a feminine profession while management is associated with masculinity, etc.

Some languages gender their words into masculine and feminine forms.

In the LGBT community 
Gender binarism may create institutionalized structures of power, and individuals who identify outside traditional gender binaries may experience discrimination and harassment. Many LGBT people, notably youth activist groups, advocate against gender binarism. Many individuals within the LGBT+ community report an internal hierarchy of power status. Some who do not identify within a binary system experience being at the bottom of the hierarchy. Different variables such as race, ethnicity, age, gender, and more can lower or raise one's perceived power.

There are many individuals and several subcultures that can be considered exceptions to the gender binary or specific transgender identities worldwide. In addition to individuals whose bodies are naturally intersex, there are also specific ceremonial and social roles that are seen as third gender. The hijra of South Asia and some Two-Spirit Indigenous Peoples of North America are often cited as examples. Feminist philosopher María Lugones argues that Western colonizers imposed their dualistic ideas of gender on indigenous peoples, replacing pre-existing indigenous concepts.

In the contemporary West, non-binary or genderqueer people do not adhere to the gender binary by refusing terms like "male" and "female", as they do not identify as either. Transgender people have a unique place in relation to the gender binary. In some cases, attempting to conform to societal expectations for their gender, transgender individuals may opt for surgery, hormones, or both.

Ball culture is an example of how the LGBT community interprets and rejects the gender binary. Paris is Burning, a film directed by Jennie Livingston, depicts New York's ballroom scene in the late 1980s. To compete in the Balls, men, women, and everyone in between create costumes and walk in their respective categories: Butch Queen, Transmale Realness, and Femme Queen to name a few. During the Balls, the gender binary is thrown out the window, and the people competing are allowed to express themselves however they interpret the category. Within the scenes of people competing in various categories there's a narrative that describes life outside the gender binary in New York. Since the film came out, there's been a decline in the Ballroom scene due to the rise of media and the appropriation of the Drag culture.

Limitations

Some scholars have contested the existence of a clear gender binary. Judith Lorber explains the problem of failing to question dividing people into these two groups "even though they often find more significant within-group differences than between-group differences." Lorber argues that this corroborates the fact that the gender binary is arbitrary and leads to false expectations of both men and women. Instead, there is growing support for the possibility of utilizing additional categories that compare people without "prior assumptions about who is like whom".

This idea of a gender as a binary is thought to be an oppressive means of reflecting differential power dynamics.

In her paper "The Five Sexes: Why Male and Female Are Not Enough," Anne Fausto-Sterling discusses the existence of intersex people, individuals possessing a combination of male and female sexual characteristics, who are seen as deviations from the norm, and who frequently undergo coercive surgery at a very young age in order to maintain the two-gender system. According to Fausto-Sterling, the existence of these individuals challenges the standards of gender binaries and puts into question society's role in constructing gender. Fausto-Sterling says that modern practitioners encourage the idea that gender is a cultural construct and concludes that "we are moving from an era of sexual dimorphism to one of variety beyond the number 2."

Cisnormativity 

Cisnormativity is a product of the gender binary that assumes people are cisgender, meaning that their gender identity matches their sex assigned at birth. Both binary and nonbinary transgender individuals are excluded from this ideology. This leads to individuals outside the gender binary experiencing disparities in health and violence at individual, interpersonal, and institutional levels due to their non-normative status.

Health disparities 
Gender binarism poses limitations on the adequacy of medical care provided to gender-nonconforming patients. There is a large gap in medical literature on non-binary populations who have unique healthcare needs. A lack of cultural competency about nonbinary gender identities among providers contributes to nonbinary transgender individuals facing greater health disparities than both binary transgender and cisgender individuals. However, cisnormativity affects transgender individuals that identify within the gender binary as well. An individual's discomfort due to incongruence with their gender identity and sex assigned at birth used to be classified as a mental illness. "Gender identity disorder" entered the DSM-IV in 1980 and was used by doctors to pathologize transgender individuals. While it was updated to the term "gender dysphoria" when the DSM-V was published in 2013, transgender health is otherwise largely absent from medical curriculums. Health systems remain cisnormative and discriminative, which lead to adverse health outcomes for transgender populations.

Violence against transgender individuals 
Transgender individuals are at a greater risk of physical and sexual intimate partner violence than cisgender individuals. The rates of intimate partner violence among transgender populations are referred to as “epidemic levels” and they are classified as a high risk population. Discrimination against transgender individuals is believed by researchers to contribute to greater risk of intimate partner violence. This is especially prominent in areas where gender identity is not legally protected against discrimination.

Transgender women of color cite both their race or ethnicity and their gender identity as factors that result in discrimination against them while white transgender women cited only their gender identity; transgender women of color experience both racism and transphobia.

Rejection 

Self-expression that opposes the gender binary is stigmatized and, in some cases, has been criminalized. The United States has a history of laws and policies against cross-dressing, such as New York's "walking while trans" law and the informal three-article rule used during the 1940s-1960s by police to punish people that dressed in a way that defied the gender binary.

There are public figures that have opposed the gender binary by wearing clothing not typically associated with their perceived gender or their gender identity, such as Prince, David Bowie, Kurt Cobain, Jaden Smith, Ruby Rose, Rain Dove, Billy Porter, and Harry Styles. Public figures that identify as of non-binary gender include Sam Smith, Indya Moore, Brigette Lundy-Paine, King Princess, Jonathan Van Ness, Bex Taylor-Klaus, Amandla Stenberg, Demi Lovato, and more.

Harry Styles' appearance on the cover of American Vogue in 2020 was the first instance with a cisgender man doing so by himself. This was groundbreaking as well as controversial due to the fact that on the cover he wore both a dress, a clothing item associated with women, as well as a blazer, which is associated with men. His embrace of clothing associated with women and men is a rejection of the gender binary.

Personal pronouns in the English language are typically associated with either men (he/him) or women (she/her), which excludes people who do not identify as a man or a woman. However, gender-neutral pronouns, such as singular they pronouns (they/them) are sometimes used by nonbinary and gender nonconforming individuals. A 2019 study found that "close to 1 in 5 Americans personally know someone who uses gender-neutral pronouns such as ‘they’ instead of ‘he’ or “’she’”. In addition, people may use neopronouns in place of other personal pronouns. Examples of neopronouns include xe/xem, ze/zim, and sie/hir.

See also

Notes

References

Further reading
 binaohan, b. decolonizing trans/gender 101. biyuti publishing, 2014. 
GenderQueer: Voices from Beyond the Sexual Binary (Alyson), (Joan Nestle, Clair Howell Co-Editors) 2002 
 

Dichotomies
Gender identity
Feminist terminology
Feminist theory
Queer theory
Transgender